HSwMS Älvsnabben (M01) was a minelayer of the Swedish Navy. She was built as a freighter, but was requisitioned by the Swedish Navy in 1943.

A single screw and good fuel economy meant that she was used as the cadet training vessel of the Swedish Navy for a number of years, and she travelled the globe multiple times.

Captains

1949–1951: Fredrik Taube
1951–1952: Magnus Starck
1953–1954: Oscar Krokstedt
1954–1955: Willy Edenberg
1956–1957: Anders Nilsson
1957–1957: Bengt Lundvall
1957–1958: Fredrik Taube
1958–1959: Gunnar Norström
1959–1960: B. Hedlund
1961–1962: Yngve Rollof
1962–1963: Ulf Eklind
1963–1964: K.K. Berggren
1964–1965: Anders Låftman
1965–1966: Nils Rydström
1966–1967: Lennart Lindgren
1967–1968: Lennart Ahrén
1968–1968: Christer Fredholm
1968–1969: Bengt Odin
1969–1969: Christer Fredholm
1969–1970: Per Broman
1970–1971: Victor Tornérhjelm
1971–1972: Torsten Malm
1972–1973: Rolf Nerpin
1973–1974: K. Ekman
1974–1975: Hans Tynnerström
1975–1976: Nils Hellström
1976–1977: Ulf Samuelsson
1977–1978: Bertil Daggfeldt
1978–1979: Roderick Klintebo
1979–1980: Carl-Gustaf Hammarskjöld

References
  Örlogsfartyg (Swedish naval Vessels); 2003.
  Örlogsfartyg - Svenska maskindrivna fartyg under tretungad flagg 2003. 

Mine warfare vessels of the Swedish Navy
Auxiliary ships of the Swedish Navy
1943 ships
Ships built in Gothenburg